Communist Party of Malta is a communist party in Malta. PKM was founded in 1969 at a secret congress in the town of Gwardamangia, following the departure from the Malta Labour Party of a group of left-wing militants that had been active in the struggle for national independence. Anthony Vassallo was the founding general secretary of the party. The party first contested the national general elections of 1987 when it obtained 0.1% of first preference votes and no parliamentary seats. Since then it has not stood for any other election whether at a European, national or local level.

The current general secretary of the party is Victor Degiovanni, who took over the post from Anthony Vassallo in 2004.

Creation 
In the 1920s secret communist cells existed; however they have always been small in number. After the 1933 sedition trials dockyard workers and intellectuals were imprisoned for the "crime" of possessing socialist literature. Progressive movements have faced large setbacks due to the sedition trials. Maltese Communists did not have their own party before the secret congress in the town of Gwardamangia in 1969.

Post-independence Activities 
After George Borg Olivier's administration was defeated the PKM officially went into the open. The PKM organised protests and meetings as well as commemorations to Maltese Working class figures in support of emancipation such as Manwel Dimech. According to the US intelligence department by 1970 PKM's membership was around 100 members. The PKM also takes part in international seminars. It has positive relations with the Workers Party of Korea and a Juche study group called The Juche Philosophy and Songun Policy Study Group.

Political organisation in the Post-Soviet Era 
PKM participates in Maltese politics by campaigning in joint-solidarity with international issues and talk about local issues.

References

External links 
 Official blog

Communist parties in Malta
Political parties established in 1969
1969 establishments in Malta
Eurosceptic parties in Malta

International Meeting of Communist and Workers Parties